Rajamanthri Walauwa or manor house of Rajamanthri is situated in Karandagolla, Hanguranketha, Sri Lanka. Rajamanthri Walauwa is an eight-room, 200-year-old mansion built by the last Chief Minister of the Kingdom of Kandy in 1804. It was fully restored in 1944. In 1970, Prince Gamini Rajamanthri and in 1972, Prince Samantha Rajamanthri, Julius Rajamanthri's two sons became the new inhabitants of the Rajamanthri Walauwa. To this day, the manor house is managed by Prince Julius' sons.

History

This villa was built in 1804 by the Chief Minister to the last King of Kandy. The kingdom at that time forbade the use of roofing tile to anyone who wasn't royalty. Despite this ban, Chief Minister Rajamanthri built a replica palace with two sprawling stories of terracotta tiles for himself. Two hundred years later, Geoffrey Bawa's protégé, Chief Minister Julius Rajamanthri from Govi Gama Radala caste, began a delicate restoration work that retained the essence of the villa. The estate is a major producer of coconuts, rubber, pepper, cardamom, ginger, cocoa, areca nut, coffee, nutmeg, cinnamon, cloves, vanilla, orchids and teak.

Meaning of walauwa
In Sinhala, walauwa means mansion. The English terms for walauwa are "manor" or "manor house", a large house with larger lands. The walauwa and its owners were supported by the larger lands and estates they possessed. These either were land grants from kings since the beginning of the Sinhalese kingdom until the Kandyan era or government service during the Colonial era, or were acquired by a successful enterprise and passed down through generations. The owners were the landed elites of Ceylon; as such they gained a status of power and wealth.

There is another theory that walauwa means a place of judgement. Those people who occupied the walauwa had the authority to pass judgement over people with the authority provided by Royal Decree. Mansions replaced the walauwa in the urban areas towards the latter part of the nineteenth century.

See also
 History of Sri Lanka
 Kandyan Convention
 Walauwa
 Sri Lankan caste system
 Sri Lankan honours system

Notes

References
 
 
 
 
 Sinhalese social organization : The Kandyan Period by Ralph Pieris (Ceylon University Press 1956) 
 An Historical Relation of the Island Ceylon in the East Indies by Robert Knox; https://www.gutenberg.org/ebooks/14346
 Seneviratna, Anuradha; Polk, Benjiman (1992). Buddhist Monastic Architecture in Sri Lanka: The Woodland Shrine. Abhinav Publications. p. 110. .
 Scriver, Peter; Prakash, Vikramaditya (2007). Colonial Modernities: Building, Dwelling and Architecture in British India and Ceylon. Routledge. pp. 206–207. .
 Seneviratna, Anuradha; De Silva, Nimal (1999). World Heritage City of Kandy, Sri Lanka: Conservation and Development Plan. Central Cultural Fund. .

Further reading
 Sinhalese social organization : The Kandyan Period by Ralph Pieris (Ceylon University Press 1956) 
 An Historical Relation of the Island Ceylon in the East Indies by Robert Knox; https://www.gutenberg.org/ebooks/14346
 Social Change in 19th century Ceylon. Patrick Peebles. 1995, Navrang 
 The Mahavamsa
 The adaptable peasant: agrarian society in western Sri Lanka under Dutch rule, 1740–1800, Nirmal Ranjith Dewasiri, p. 201
 Sri Lanka Walauwa Directory by Dr Mirando Obeysekara (Samanthi Book Publishers) 

Buildings and structures completed in 1804
Houses in Kandy
Manor houses in Sri Lanka